1565 Lemaître, provisional designation , is a highly eccentric Phocaea asteroid and sizable Mars-crosser from the inner regions of the asteroid belt, approximately 8 kilometers in diameter. It was discovered on 25 November 1948, by Belgian astronomer Sylvain Arend at the Royal Observatory of Belgium in Uccle, Belgium. It was named after cosmologist and priest Georges Lemaître.

Classification and orbit 

Lemaître is a Mars-crossing asteroid, as it crosses the orbit of Mars at 1.666 AU. It is also an eccentric member of the Phocaea family. This asteroid orbits the Sun at a distance of 1.6–3.2 AU once every 3 years and 8 months (1,353 days). Its orbit has an eccentricity of 0.35 and an inclination of 21° with respect to the ecliptic. As no precoveries were taken, and no prior identifications were made, Lemaîtres observation arc begins on the night following its official discovery observation.

Physical characteristics 

In the SMASS taxonomy, Lemaître is characterized as a Sq-type, a transitional class of stony S-type and Q-type asteroids.

Lightcurves 

In September 2007, a rotational light-curve of Lemaître was obtained from photometric observations by American astronomer Brian D. Warner at his Palmer Divide Observatory, Colorado. It gave a rotation period of 11.403 hours with a brightness variation of 0.04 magnitude, superseding a provisional period of 2.4 hours with an amplitude of 0.03 magnitude, derived from photometric observations made by Arnaud Leroy, Bernard Trégon, Xavier Durivaud and Federico Manzini two months earlier.

Diameter and albedo 

According to the surveys carried out by the Japanese Akari satellite and NASA's Wide-field Infrared Survey Explorer with its subsequent NEOWISE mission, Lemaître measures between 6.90 and 8.00 kilometers in diameter, and its surface has an albedo between 0.22 and 0.334. The Collaborative Asteroid Lightcurve Link assumes a standard albedo for Phocaea asteroids of 0.23 – derived from 25 Phocaea, the family's most massiv member and namesake – and calculates a diameter of 8.76 kilometers based on an absolute magnitude of 12.5.

Naming 

This minor planet was named in honour of Belgian priest, astronomer and professor of physics, Georges Lemaître (1894–1966), widely regarded as the father of the Big Bang theory. The lunar crater Lemaître also bears his name. Lemaître was the first minor planet to be numbered after the end of World War II. The official  was published by the Minor Planet Center on 1 June 1975.

References

External links 
 Lightcurve plot of 1565 Lemaitre, Palmer Divide Observatory, B. D. Warner (2007)
 Asteroid Lightcurve Database (LCDB), query form (info )
 Dictionary of Minor Planet Names, Google books
 Asteroids and comets rotation curves, CdR – Observatoire de Genève, Raoul Behrend
 Discovery Circumstances: Numbered Minor Planets (1)-(5000) – Minor Planet Center
 
 

 

001565
001565
Discoveries by Sylvain Arend
Named minor planets
001565
19481125